Bhawanipore FC is an Indian professional football club based in Bhowanipore, Kolkata, West Bengal. The club was established in 1910, and competed in the I-League 2nd division in 2020–21 season, then second tier of Indian football league system. Bhawanipore currently competes in the Calcutta Premier Division A.

History
Bhawanipore Football Club was founded in 1910 by Nani Mitra in Bhowanipore, Kolkata. After the independence of India, Robi Das became the first ever footballer from Bhawanipore who represented India in men's tournament at the 1948 Summer Olympics in London. The club in 1948, reached the final of IFA Shield and finished as runner-up after a 2–1 defeat to Mohun Bagan. In January 2012, they were officially certified by the All India Football Federation to participate in the I-League 2nd Division, the second tier of football in India. After playing 6 games during the season Bhawanipore ended in 6th place out of 7 in Group C and thus failed to move to the Final half. They have also participated in domestic tournaments such as IFA Shield, and Durand Cup. In the 1960s, Bhawanipore have gone through rivalries with two of India's most successful clubs Mohun Bagan and East Bengal in CFL. Notable Bengali footballers Asim Moulick and Parimal Dey appeared with the club in 1971.

In 2013, Bhawanipore clinched the Bordoloi Trophy, defeating Aizawl 1–0. They achieved third place in the 2013 I-League 2nd Division. In next season, the club participated in 2014 I-League 2nd Division and moved to the final round of I-League qualifiers, and achieved second place with 17 points in 8 matches. In May 2018, they officially announced that legendary defender Subrata Bhattacharya was appointed as new head coach.

In the 2019–20 I-League 2nd Division, Bhawanipore participated and made it to the final round of I-League qualifiers. Sankarlal Chakraborty was appointed as head coach and they signed who foreign players; Liberian Ansumana Kromah and Ghanaian Philip Adjah. Due to the COVID-19 pandemic in India, usual final round format was scrapped off. It was decided that the final round of the league will be rescheduled into a new format and all the non-reserve teams from the preliminary stage will automatically progress to this round. It was officially named as I-League Qualifiers. The teams from the preliminary round were scheduled to play in a round-robin format in two venues, at the Salt Lake Stadium in Kolkata and Kalyani Stadium in Kalyani, near Kolkata to advance to the 2020–21 I-League. Bhawanipore finished on the second position of the league table at the end of I-League qualifiers, with 9 points in 4 matches. In 2022 Calcutta Premier Division, Bhawanipore as group champion, qualified to "super six" round and finished as runner-up, behind Mohammedan Sporting.

Management and sponsorship
In 2012, Sangbad Pratidin became a premium sponsor of the club and they were also affiliated with Mohun Bagan AC. Sangbad Pratidin Bhawanipore Football Club Private Limited was incorporated on 22 December 2011. Its last annual general meet (AGM) happened on 29 September 2017. Its current board members and directors are Ashok Kumar Tiwari and Arun Sengupta.

Stadium

Bhawanipore Football Club currently plays at the 20,000 seater Kalyani Municipal Corporation Stadium in Kalyani. They also use Rabindra Sarobar Stadium for some of their home matches.

Fans
Football is pretty famous in Bhawanipore. A club recognised Bhowanipore fan club by the name West Bengal Palace, has been in support since 2019. The Kalyani Municipal Corporation Stadium main galleries have seen an average attendance of 20,000. The players and the coach have often acknowledged the fans' support in the success and called them The 12th Man.

Kit manufacturers and shirt sponsors

Rivalry
Bhawanipore has the rivalries with other two Calcutta Football League sides Kalighat Milan Sangha and Tollygunge Agragami FC, which is often referred to as the "South Kolkata Derby".

South Kolkata Derby

Players

Current squad

Season statistics

Key
Tms. = Number of teams
Pos. = Position in league
Attendance/G = Average league attendance

Managerial history
updated on 20 January 2020

Honours

League
I-League 2nd Division
Runners-up (2): 2014–15, 2019–20
Third place (1): 2012–13

CFL Premier Division
Runners-up (1): 2022

Cup
Ogilvie Cup
Winners (1): 1944
Bordoloi Trophy
Winners (1): 2013
IFA Shield
Runners-up (1): 1948
Naihati Gold Cup
Winners (1): 2022

Other department

Men's cricket
Bhawanipore FC's men's cricket (named 'Bhawanipore Club') section is under the jurisdiction of the Cricket Association of Bengal (CAB), and competes in First Division League, J.C. Mukherjee T-20 Trophy and other regional tournaments. Club's cricket section is currently headquartered in 1, Nepal Bhattacharjee Street, Kolkata.

See also
 Football in Kolkata
 List of football clubs in Kolkata

References

Further reading

External links

Bhawanipore FC at Soccerway
Bhawanipore FC at the-aiff.com

Bhawanipore FC
Football clubs in Kolkata
Association football clubs established in 1910
1910 establishments in India
I-League 2nd Division clubs